August Jürima (also Jürman(n); 23 August 1887 Villakvere, Vaimastvere Parish (now Väike-Maarja Parish), Kreis Dorpat – 15 June 1942 Kirov Oblast) was an Estonian agronomist, economist and politician. He was a member of V Riigikogu. 1932-1933 he was Minister of Economic Affairs.

References

1887 births
1942 deaths
People from Väike-Maarja Parish
People from Kreis Dorpat
Farmers' Assemblies politicians
Patriotic League (Estonia) politicians
Government ministers of Estonia
Agriculture ministers of Estonia
Finance ministers of Estonia
Ministers of the Interior of Estonia
Members of the Estonian Constituent Assembly
Members of the Riigikogu, 1920–1923
Members of the Riigikogu, 1923–1926
Members of the Riigikogu, 1926–1929
Members of the Riigikogu, 1929–1932
Members of the Riigikogu, 1932–1934
Members of the Estonian National Assembly
Members of the Riigivolikogu
Estonian agronomists
Hugo Treffner Gymnasium alumni
University of Königsberg alumni
Recipients of the Order of the White Star, 1st Class
Recipients of the Military Order of the Cross of the Eagle, Class II
Recipients of the Military Order of the Cross of the Eagle, Class III
Estonian people executed by the Soviet Union